Port Douglas Crocs Australian Football Club is an Australian rules football club based to the north of that region in Port Douglas, Queensland and is the club sited furthest north on the east coast of Australia.

The football team currently plays in the AFL Cairns League. Whilst the league is based in Cairns, Queensland, Port Douglas is a popular tourist destination and is close to both the Great Barrier Reef and the Daintree National Park rainforest.

History
The Port Douglas Football Club was established by Ernest Baxter and Andrew Smith in 1989.

Home ground
Port Douglas Sporting Complex - Wharf Street, Port Douglas

Honours
AFL Cairns (9): 1991, 2001, 2005, 2014, 2016, 2017, 2018, 2019, 2020
 Reserves premierships (7): 1999, 2001, 2003, 2004, 2005, 2014, 2017, 2020

References

External links
Official site

Australian rules football clubs in Queensland
1989 establishments in Australia